General elections were held in Jordan on 4 November 1997. They were boycotted by the main opposition parties, and saw independents win 75 of the 80 seats. Voter turnout was 44.7%.

Results

References

Elections in Jordan
1997 in Jordan
Jordan
Election and referendum articles with incomplete results
November 1997 events in Asia